Habib Sharifi was an Iranian association footballer. He played and scored for Iran national football team once.

References 

Iran international footballers
Iranian footballers
Pas players
Association football forwards
Year of birth missing
Sportspeople from Khuzestan province